Sociedad Deportiva Lemona was a Spanish football team based in Lemoa, in the autonomous community of Basque Country. Founded in 1923, it last played in Segunda División B – Group 2, holding home matches at Estadio Arlonagusia, with a capacity of 5,000 seats.

The club were losing finalists in the Copa Federación de España in the 2010–11 and 2011–12 seasons.

Lemona was disbanded in July 2012 due to financial problems.

Season to season

20 seasons in Segunda División B
14 seasons in Tercera División

Honours
Tercera División: 2000–01, 2001–02
RFEF Basque tournament: 1995–96, 1996–97, 1999–2000, 2010–11, 2011–12

Notable former players
  Juan Cuyami
  Javier Iturriaga
 Iosu Iglesias
 Markel Robles
 Zigor Goikuria
 Álvaro Martínez
 Gaizka Toquero

Notable former coaches
 Iñigo Liceranzu
 Aitor Larrazábal

References

External links
Official website 
Futbolme team profile 

 
Defunct football clubs in the Basque Country (autonomous community)
Association football clubs established in 1923
Association football clubs disestablished in 2012
1923 establishments in Spain
2012 disestablishments in Spain